Catherine McWilliams (born 1940) is a visual artist from Northern Ireland.

Biography
Catherine McWilliams was born  in 1940 in Belfast. She attended the Belfast School of Art. She began exhibiting her work in 1961.

She and her husband, Joseph McWilliams, opened the Cavehill Gallery in 1986. She worked as a teacher in Art at Rupert Stanley College until 1990.

McWilliams has been awarded a number of prizes and grants. Her art is part of the public collections in the Arts Council of Northern Ireland and The National Self Portrait Collection, University of Limerick.

Awards
 2020 Sculpture Prize Sponsored by Hamilton Architects, Royal Ulster Academy, 2020
 2003 General Arts Scheme Award, Arts Council of N. Ireland
 1999 Arts Council of N. Ireland award for materials
 1992 Arts Council of N. Ireland award for materials
 1992 British Council travel award
 1992 An Chomhairle Ealaion travel award

Sources

1940 births
Living people
Irish artists
Irish women artists